Oligostraca is a superclass of crustaceans. It includes the seed shrimp, mystacocarids, branchiurans and pentastomids.

References

Taxa described in 1997
Crustacean taxonomy
Superclasses (biology)